Baseer Ahmad Khan  is a  Kashmir Administrative Service officer and inducted to Indian Administrative Service (IAS) in 2000 retired as a Divisional Commissioner (Kashmir) . Later on the 15th  March 2020, he was appointed as an advisor to the Lieutenant Governor of the Union Territory of Jammu and Kashmir Manoj Sinha. On 5th October 2021 ,the UT government relieved Baseer Ahmad Khan of the charge of advisor to the Jammu and Kashmir Lieutenant Governor following a communication from the Union Ministry of Home Affairs.

Background 
In 2009, when he was Deputy Commissioner, Baramulla, he was an accused in the Gulmarg Land Scam. Khan was Deputy Commissioner Srinagar district between December 2011 and March 2013. He was Divisional Commissioner, Kashmir, when he attained the age of superannuation on 30 June 2019; however the government extended his service by a year, but before his term was due to end, he was made the fourth advisor to the Lieutenant Governor of Jammu and Kashmir, G. C. Murmu in March 2020. As advisor he manages the portfolios of "Power development Department, Rural Development and Panchayati Raj, Culture, Tourism and Floriculture " among other things.

References 

Indian Administrative Service officers
Living people
Advisor to Lieutenant Governor of Jammu and Kashmir
Year of birth missing (living people)